The Senate of Thailand (formerly known as Phruetthasapha is the upper house of the National Assembly of Thailand, Thailand's legislative branch. In accordance with the 2017 Constitution of Thailand, the Senate is a non-partisan legislative chamber, composed of 250 members. All 250 Senators are appointed by the Royal Thai Military. Senators serve five year terms in office.

Both the Senate and the House of Representatives were abolished as a result of the 2014 Thai coup d'état. These were replaced with the unicameral National Legislative Assembly, a body of 250 members, selected by the National Council for Peace and Order. However, the new 2017 constitution, which was approved by a referendum in 2016, re-established the Senate. Following the 2019 general elections, the Senate is to be composed of 250 military-appointed members, so it is considered as a rubber stamp legislative.

After the promulgation of the 2017 Constitution in April 2017, the Senate was re-established but the constitution allowed the military National Legislative Assembly to remain in place until the Senate was formed following the 2019 general election.

History
The idea of bicameralism first permeated Thai politics with the Constitution of 1946, when the government of Pridi Banomyong introduced a Senate modelled on the British House of Lords. For the first time, an upper house came into existence in Thailand. The Senate was to be fully elected, however, the elections would be indirect, as the House of Representatives would elect the senators, for six-year terms. The 1946 Constitution was soon abrogated in a military coup. Subsequent constitutions saw only occasional bicameralism, and when it did exist, the Senate was always filled with appointees from the military and the elite. The 1997 Constitution saw a return to a fully elected Senate. That constitution was abrogated after the 2006 coup, and replaced with one calling for a half-elected/half-appointed Senate.

 1947 – First Thai Senate established with 100 members, all royally appointed.
 1952 – Establishment of a unicameral National Assembly with 123 members.
 1968 – Re-establishment of the Senate with 164 royally-appointed members.
 1972 - The Thai Legislature is banned by Thanom Kittikachorn.
 1974 – Return of the royally-appointed Senate.
 1976 – Re-establishment of a unicameral National Assembly with 360 members, all royally appointed.
 1978 – Return of a Senate with 225 royally-appointed members.
 1991 – Establishment of a unicameral National Assembly with 292 royally-appointed members.
 1997 – Establishment for the first time of a fully and directly elected Senate with 200 members for a 6-year term.
 2006 – Following the military coup, an interim charter was signed establishing a 250-member National Legislative Assembly.
 2007 – Half of the Senate is appointed, half is elected as established by referendum under the 2007 Constitution. 
 2014 – Following the military coup, an interim constitution was passed establishing a 220-member National Legislative Assembly.
 2018 – After the signing of the 2017 Constitution, the National Assembly was reestablished and the NLA was dissolved, with the Senate to be composed of 250 military-appointed members following the 2019 general elections.

List of Senate regular elections

21st century 
2000 Thai Senate election
2006 Thai Senate election
2008 Thai Senate election
2014 Thai Senate election

Composition
The 250-person Senate is composed of 194 members selected by the ruling junta. Fifty senators represent 10 professional and social groups: bureaucrats, teachers, judges, farmers, and private companies. A shortlist of 200 were proposed to the NCPO which made the final selection of fifty. The remaining six Senate positions are reserved for the supreme commander of the Armed Forces, the defence permanent secretary, the national police chief, and the heads of the army, navy, and air force, who are all senators ex officio.  104 of the 250 senators are military or police officers.

Qualifications
The qualifications for the membership of the Senate could be found in section 115, Part 3, Chapter 6 of the 2007 Constitution. A candidate intent on being a member of the Senate had to be a natural born citizen of Thailand as well as being 40 years or older on the year of election or selection. The candidate must have graduated with at least a bachelor's degree or an equivalent. Elected candidates must have been born, must have had a home and had to be registered to vote in the province which the candidate intended to represent. The candidate must not have been an ascendant, spouse or a child of a member of the House of Representatives or any person holding a political position and must not have been a member of a political party for at least five years.

All other disqualifications were similar to that of the House, the individual must not have been: addicted to drugs, been bankrupt, a convicted felon, a member of a local administration, a civil servant, a member of the judiciary or any other government agency. Being disenfranchised (being a member of the clergy, felon, or mentally infirm). If the candidate was a member of a local administration or a Minister he must have left his post for a period of at least five years before being eligible.

Appointment
Depending on the situation in each constitution.

Term
The term of the Senate is five years. The term is fixed, therefore the Senate cannot be dissolved under any circumstances and would be re-elected in accordance with a Royal Decree issued thirty days after the expiration of the term.

Membership
Members of the Senate are entitled use the title Senator in front of their names (. Membership of an elected Senator began on the senate election day, while an appointed senator became a member after the publication of the election result by the Electoral Commission. Senators could not hold more than one consecutive term, therefore senators could not be re-elected. A Senator whose membership expired before a new Senator could be named continued his or her duties until such seats were occupied. If there was a vacancy the seat was immediately filled either by election or appointment.

Powers 
The Senate shares many powers with the House of Representatives; these include:

Legislation
Scrutiny
Passing of annual Appropriations Bills
Constitutional Amendments

Exclusive Powers:

Creating and appointing committee to examine and investigate affairs.
Passing approval resolutions advising the King in certain appointments.
Judges of the Constitutional Court of Thailand
Election Commissioners
Ombudsmen
Members of the National Anti-Corruption Commission, State Audit Commission (including the Auditor General) and National Human Rights Commission.
The Senate also advised the selection and the actual selection of certain members of the Judiciary.
Selection of its Officers.
Expulsion of members.
Determination of its own rules and procedures.

Leadership

The Senate elected three presiding officers; one President and two Vice Presidents. The President of the Senate was also the ex-officio Vice President of the National Assembly of Thailand. The election was done by secret ballot, after a resolution finalizing the selection the name was submitted to the king for formal appointment. There were no partisan officers as the Senate of Thailand was a non-partisan chamber.

See also
Constitutions of Thailand
2007 Constitution of Thailand
National Assembly of Thailand

References

Further reading

External links
Inter Parliamentary Affairs, NLA
Thai Senate

Parliament of Thailand
1947 establishments in Thailand
Thailand